The Bravos de Nuevo Laredo is a soccer club in the Mexican Football League Liga TDP in Nuevo Laredo, Tamaulipas, Mexico. The Unidad Deportiva Benito Juárez (Benito Juárez Sport Complex) is their home stadium. During Clausura 2011, the Bravos became Liga Premier Sub-Champs.

History
The Bravos are an institution formed in 2004 by a group of business people in Nuevo Laredo, whose objective is to organize a soccer team in the city with aspirations it will become a professional soccer club.

League Record

Roster

External links
Bravos de Nuevo Laredo Official Website "La Pagina Brava" 
Mexican Football League Second Division Official Website 

Football clubs in Tamaulipas
2004 establishments in Mexico
Tercera División de México
Association football clubs established in 2004